Tetrapyrroles are a class of chemical compounds that contain four pyrrole or pyrrole-like rings.  The pyrrole/pyrrole derivatives are linked by (=- or -- units), in either a linear or a cyclic fashion.  Pyrroles are a five-atom ring with four carbon atoms and one nitrogen atom.  Tetrapyrroles are common cofactors in biochemistry and their biosynthesis and degradation feature prominently in the chemistry of life.

Some tetrapyrroles form the active core of compounds with crucial biochemical roles in living systems, such as hemoglobin and chlorophyll. In these two molecules, in particular, the pyrrole macrocycle ring frames a metal atom, that forms a coordination compound with the pyrroles and plays a central role in the biochemical function of those molecules.

Structure
Linear tetrapyrroles (called bilanes) include:
Heme breakdown products (e.g., bilirubin, biliverdin)
Phycobilins (found in cyanobacteria)
Luciferins as found in dinoflagellates and euphausiid shrimps (krill)

Cyclic tetrapyrroles having four one-carbon bridges include:
Porphin, the simplest tetrapyrrole 
Porphyrins, including heme, the core of hemoglobin
Chlorins, including those at the core of chlorophyll.
Cyclic tetrapyrroles having three one-carbon bridges and one direct bond between the pyrroles include:
Corrins, including the cores of cobalamins, when complexed with a cobalt ion.

The tetrapyrrole portions of the molecules typically act as chromophores because of a high degree of conjugation in them.  Therefore, these compounds are commonly colored.

References